Early Childhood Australia is an early childhood advocacy organisation in Australia, acting in the interests of young children, their families and those in the early childhood education and care field. Its chief executive officer is Samantha Page. In 2020, it advocated increased subsidies for early childhood education in response to cuts in the federal Child Care Subsidy. It also supports JobKeeper benefits for day care workers. Early Childhood Australia was established as a result of medical practitioner Vera Scantlebury Brown's reports on infant welfare.

References

External links
 

1938 establishments in Australia
Child care skills organizations
Child-related organisations in Australia
Early childhood educational organizations
Educational organisations based in Australia
Organizations established in 1938